William Melvin Smith Jr. (May 16, 1924 – February 8, 2013) was an American former competition swimmer, two-time Olympic champion, and a former world record-holder in four events.  He was one of the most successful competitive swimmers in the United States in the first half of the 20th century.

Smith was born in Honolulu, Hawaii, of mixed Irish and Hawaiian ancestry.  He attended Ohio State University, and competed for the Ohio State Buckeyes swimming and diving team within the National Collegiate Athletic Association (NCAA).  As a college swimmer, he was undefeated in three years of dual meet competition, and was a four-time All-American.  He set seven world records and won fourteen U.S. national championships: seven NCAA, six AAU indoor and one AAU outdoor.

At the 1948 Summer Olympics in London, England, Smith won gold medals in the 400-meter freestyle and 4×200-meter freestyle relay.  At one time, Smith held all of the world records in freestyle swimming events between 200 and 1,000 meters.

At the US Olympic trials of the 1948 4x200-meter freestyle relay, several swimmers who had already qualified in other events slowed down in their heats or swam fast in the prelims and scratched themselves for the final to allow more swimmers to qualify for the US Olympic Team. Smith was one of the instigators of this "conspiracy". 

Ultimately, coach Robert Kiphuth did hold a time trial shortly after the actual trials with eleven of the swimmers.  This time trial had Jimmy McLane as first overall with a time of 2:11.0, Bill Smith, and Wally Wolf in 2:11.2, and Wally Ris in 2:12.4.  This quartet was used for the Olympic final and won the gold medal.  The next four-Eugene Rogers in 2:14.2, Edwin Gilbert in 2:15.4, Robert Gibe in 2:15.6, and William Dudley in 2:15.9, were used in the Olympic prelims. The next three swimmers-Joe Verdeur who came in 2:16.3, Alan Ford in 2;16.4 and George Hoogerhyde in 2:17.4 were not used in any capacity in the 4x200 freestyle relay.

After retiring from competitions Smith became captain of the surf guards at Waikiki Beach, coached swimmers at the University of Hawaii, and served as safety director for the Honolulu Department of Parks and Recreation for 25 years. He also coached masters swimmers at the Kamehameha Swim Club. 

Smith was inducted into the International Swimming Hall of Fame in 1966. In 2001 he was named Ohio State University's swimmer of the century by the Columbus Touchdown Club. He died February 8, 2013; he was 88 years old.

See also
 List of members of the International Swimming Hall of Fame
 List of Ohio State University people
 List of Olympic medalists in swimming (men)
 World record progression 200 metres freestyle
 World record progression 400 metres freestyle
 World record progression 800 metres freestyle
 World record progression 4 × 200 metres freestyle relay

References

1924 births
2013 deaths
American male freestyle swimmers
World record setters in swimming
Ohio State Buckeyes men's swimmers
Olympic gold medalists for the United States in swimming
Sportspeople from Hawaii
Swimmers at the 1948 Summer Olympics
Medalists at the 1948 Summer Olympics
Swimmers from Hawaii
Hawaii Rainbow Warriors and Rainbow Wahine swimming coaches